
This is a list of the 27 players who earned their 2014 European Tour card through Q School in 2013.

 2014 European Tour rookie

2014 Results

* European Tour rookie in 2014
T = Tied 
 The player retained his European Tour card for 2016 (finished inside the top 110, or won).
 The player did not retain his European Tour card for 2016, but retained conditional status (finished between 111–147).
 The player did not retain his European Tour card for 2015 (finished outside the top 147).

Korhonen regained his card for 2015 through Q School.

Winners on the European Tour in 2014

1 Event shortened to 36 holes due to poor weather

Runners-up on the European Tour in 2014

See also
2013 Challenge Tour graduates
2014 European Tour

References

External links

European Tour
European Tour Qualifying School Graduates
European Tour Qualifying School Graduates